In Greek mythology, Pereus (Ancient Greek: Περέος) was an Arcadian prince as the son of King Elatus and Laodice, daughter of King Cinyras. He had four brothers namely, Stymphalus, Aepytus, Ischys and Cyllen. Pereus had a daughter, Neaera who married Autolycus, son of Daedalion.

Notes

References 

 Apollodorus, The Library with an English Translation by Sir James George Frazer, F.B.A., F.R.S. in 2 Volumes, Cambridge, MA, Harvard University Press; London, William Heinemann Ltd. 1921. . Online version at the Perseus Digital Library. Greek text available from the same website.
Pausanias, Description of Greece with an English Translation by W.H.S. Jones, Litt.D., and H.A. Ormerod, M.A., in 4 Volumes. Cambridge, MA, Harvard University Press; London, William Heinemann Ltd. 1918. . Online version at the Perseus Digital Library
 Pausanias, Graeciae Descriptio. 3 vols. Leipzig, Teubner. 1903.  Greek text available at the Perseus Digital Library.

Princes in Greek mythology
Arcadian mythology